Deniss Pavlovs (born 15 April 1983) is a Latvian former tennis player who played on the ATP Challenger Tour. On 20 July 2009, he reached his highest ATP singles ranking of World No. 263, whilst his highest doubles ranking of 155 was reached on 23 September 2009.

Pavlovs represents his native country Latvia while competing in the Davis Cup. He has a singles record of 7–7 and a doubles record of 9–6 for a combined record of 16–13 in Davis Cup play.

Deniss has reached 12 career singles finals resulting in 4 wins and 8 runners up. In addition, he has reached 56 career doubles finals, resulting in 33 wins and 23 losses, including a 2–4 record in ATP Challenger Tour finals.

ATP Challenger and ITF Futures finals

Singles: 12 (4–8)

Doubles: 56 (33–23)

References

External links
 
 
 

1983 births
Living people
Latvian male tennis players
Latvian people of Russian descent
Sportspeople from Riga